Luton East is a former United Kingdom Parliamentary constituency. It was created in 1974 from the bulk of abolished Luton constituency. It was abolished in 1983 when it was absorbed into the new Borough Constituency of Luton South.

Boundaries
The County Borough of Luton wards of Central, Crawley, High Town, South, Stopsley, and Wardown.

Members of Parliament

Elections

See also
List of former United Kingdom Parliament constituencies

References

Parliamentary constituencies in Bedfordshire (historic)
Constituencies of the Parliament of the United Kingdom established in 1974
Constituencies of the Parliament of the United Kingdom disestablished in 1983
Politics of Luton